Mea culpa is a Chilean television series broadcast by Televisión Nacional de Chile in prime time, hosted by journalist Carlos Pinto. He recreates with actors the crimes that have shocked Chilean public opinion in a trustworthy way, which, in its original broadcasts, earned him a large audience in his country of origin. Its first broadcast was on June 2, 1993, presented by journalist Cecilia Serrano. The main music at the beginning of the program was composed by Edgardo Riquelme in 1993 who also composed certain themes used as incidental music in some chapters.

Given its graphic dramatization of murders, rapes or other crimes that endanger human life, this series is exclusively for adults.

After twelve years of the last episode issued, on October 21, 2021 a new season premiered, replicating the success of its broadcasts in the 90s and 2000s. The new episodes of 2021 have been promoted as 'Mea Culpa: El Regreso' (Mea Culpa returns, in Spanish).

History 
At the beginning the program was presented by the journalist Cecilia Serrano, recognized for being a host, at that time the main TVN newscast, with an introduction to the case, then she continued with the recreation of the case, a case with different themes each week. At the end, the psychologist Giorgio Agostini Vicentini and the criminologist lawyer Andrés Domínguez Vial were discussed about the case, as well as a guest depending on the case. In the following seasons it changed and only the recreations were presented and within these, an expert in the subject was consulted.

During its broadcast, it beat the ratings of its competitor's programs in its schedule. At first they were broadcast on Wednesdays, and then it surpassed Martes 13 of Canal 13, between 1993 and 1995. Although the program during its broadcast varied on its broadcast day, its schedule was maintained, always surpassing other programs.

Between 2000 and March 2003 there were no new chapters and they only gave replays after midnight. In April 2003, a new season returns after four years of recess and he beat Canal 13's first Vértigo season on Thursdays at 10:00 pm. Then in 2004 another season returns for Monday and beats Morandé con Compañía de Mega. Between 2005 and 2008 there were five seasons in a row one each year.

While the show was never officially canceled, and a final episode was unnecessary, being an episodic series, its last season is considered to have aired between 2008 and 2009. A series of similar themes was broadcast several years later, this time on Canal 13, called "Irreversible", which was almost the same, although without the interviewers to the real culprits.

As of July 11, 2017, TVN uploaded the entire series to YouTube, where all 150 episodes are currently available for viewing.

In 2020, during COVID-19 pandemic, as part of the special programming of TVN, this program began to be broadcast randomly at midnight on Saturday, again having great success with viewers.

Cast 
The cast of the series was very varied in its nearly 16 years of broadcast, with the following actors appearing in at least 5 episodes.

 Patricio Andrade (7 episodes: 2003.2008)
 Maité Fernández (5 episodes: 2004–2008)
 María Teresa Palma (5 episodes: 2003–2008)
 Raúl Roco (5 episodes: 1995–2007)

Episodes

Season 1 (1994) 
 1. Cita con el Amor
 2. Presunta Desgracia
 3. La Berenice
 4. Fue una Pasión
 5. La Llamada Fatal
 6. Por mi Hijo
 7. Volver a Nacer
 8. Yo Acuso 
 9. Adiós a los Sueños
 10. La Visita
 11. Dios Existe
 12. La Bodega

Season 2 (1994) 

 1. El Exorcismo
 2. El Amor de Marjory y Alexander 
 3. La Gran Estafa a Las Isapres
 4. Erase una vez una Madre
 5. El Silencio de los Culpables
 6. El Último Adiós
 7. Entre el Amor y los Sueños (Part 1)
 8. Entre el Amor y los Sueños (Part 2)
 9. El Resplandor 
 10. Escape de la Muerte
 11. El Desencuentro
 12. El Límite

Season 3 (1995) 

 1. El Silencio de los Culpables 
 2. El Penoso Camino de la Violencia
 3. El paredón del desierto (Part 1)
 4. El paredón del desierto (Part 2) 
 5. Es Tiempo de Vivir
 6. El Camino Sin Regreso
 7. El Corazón en tus Manos 
 8. El Terrorista I parte
 9. El Terrorista II parte 
 10. El Toro de Quilamuta
 11. El Encuentro Final
 12. El protagonista (Johnny Cien Pesos)

Season 4 (1996) 

 1. Era un Martes 13
 2. El Asaltante Solitario
 3. El Sueño Inconcluso (El Extranjero)
 4. En Nombre del Amor 
 5. El Charro Dorotea
 6. El Desconocido
 7. Era Solo una Niña 
 8. El Viernes Negro
 9. Entre el Miedo y el Dolor
 10. El Regalo
 11. El Día Inolvidable

Season 5 (1997) 

 1. El Embrujo de Salamanca
 2. El Eterno Castigo
 3. El Pasado
 4. En Un Pueblo del Sur
 5. El Último Grito
 6. El Honor De La Familia
 7. El Padre
 8. El Doctor
 9. El Sepulturero 
 10. El Estudiante
 11. El Amante
 12. El Enfermo
 13. El Exorcismo

Season 6 (1998) 

 1. El Forastero de la Muerte 
 2. El Día de la Crisis
 3. El Sueño Roto
 4. El Elegido 
 5. El Niño Jesús
 6. El Dolor de la Inocencia
 7. El Maldito Placer
 8. El Incidente 
 9. El Verdugo de la Inocencia
 10. El Profesor
 11. Eran Las Diez

Season 7 (1999) 

 1. El Crimen Perfecto
 2. El Cautiverio
 3. El Padrastro
 4. El Rubencito
 5. El Desprecio
 6. El Hermano
 7. El Abandono
 8. El Ladrón
 9. El Viaje
 10. El Engaño
 11. El Robo

Season 8 (2003) 

 1. El Proceso
 2. El Tucho Caldera
 3. El Incidente
 4. El Joya 
 5. El Veneno
 6. El Sádico
 7. El Cementerio de Dardignac 
 8. El Incendio
 9. El Canciller 
 10. El Taxi (Part 1)
 11. El Taxi (Part 2)
 12. El Padre

Season 9 (2004) 

 1. El Mercenario
 2. El Amor Imposible
 3. El Castigo
 4. El Visitante
 5. El Heredero
 6. Entre Cuatro Paredes
 7. El Pirómano
 8. El Diagnóstico 
 9. El Arrebato
 10. El Testimonio
 11. El Mano de Tijeras

Season 10 (2005) 

 1. El Croata 
 2. El Portal Lyon
 3. El Cuatrero
 4. El Analfabeto
 5. El Encargo
 6. El Cuidador 
 7. Emilio
 8. El Tambor 
 9. El Doctor Amor
 10. El Bosque
 11. El Adiós
 12. El Pediatra

Season 11 (2006) 

 1. El Alex 
 2. Esos Niños (Part 1)
 3. Esos Niños (Part 2)
 4. El Único Camino
 5. El Nono y la Pola
 6. El Amante 
 7. El Psicópata de Pozo Almonte
 8. El Sicario
 9. El Inculpado
 10. Ella empezó a los trece años
 11. El Séptimo Piso
 12. El Enfrentamiento
 13. El Guardia

Season 12 (2007) 

 1. El Canero
 2. El Sacerdote
 3. El Colectivo
 4. El Vengador 
 5. El Descontrol
 6. El Amor Justiciero
 7. El Policía
 8. El Cumpleaños
 9. Tito Van Damme
 10. El Agobio
 11. El Despedido
 12. El Cuidador

Season 13 (2008) 

 1. El Guardia
 2. El Hijo Pródigo
 3. El Niño Problema
 4. El Crimen Imperfecto
 5. El Vengador 
 6. En el nombre del Padre
 7. El Internado (Part 1)
 8. El Internado (Part 2)
 9. En Manos de Dios
 10. El Amigo Íntimo
 11. El Amor de Madre
 12. El Manipulador
 13. El Embaucador
 14. El Desaparecido
 15. Ella Tenía 10 Meses
 16. El Lado Oscuro del Sexo 
 17. El Taxi de Alto Hospicio

Season 14 (2021) 
 1. Un cuento salvaje
 2. El Chacal de Puerto Montt
 3. Adiós al cariño
 4. El brujo
 5. El plan imperfecto
 6. El alma sucia
 7. A la sombra del padre

References 

1990s Chilean crime drama television series
2000s Chilean crime drama television series
2020s Chilean crime drama television series
1990s Chilean mystery television series
2000s Chilean mystery television series
2020s Chilean mystery television series
1990s Chilean police procedural television series
2000s Chilean police procedural television series
2020s Chilean police procedural television series
1993 Chilean television series debuts
1990s Chilean television series
2000s Chilean television series
2020s Chilean television series
Televisión Nacional de Chile original programming
Crime thriller television series
Spanish-language television shows
Televisión Nacional de Chile telenovelas